Sergeyevka is a rural locality (a khutor) in Kundryaksky Selsoviet, Sterlibashevsky District, Bashkortostan, Russia. The population was 33 as of 2010. There is 1 street.

Geography 
Sergeyevka is located 10 km southeast of Sterlibashevo (the district's administrative centre) by road. Borisovka is the nearest rural locality.

References 

Rural localities in Sterlibashevsky District